SMS Kaiserin Elisabeth was a  protected cruiser of the Austro-Hungarian Navy. Named in honor of the Empress Elisabeth, consort of Emperor Franz Josef, the cruiser was designed for overseas service and in fact was stationed in China at the outbreak of World War I in 1914.

Specifications
Launched at the naval shipyard at Pola on 25 September 1890, Kaiserin Elisabeth was a steel-hulled vessel of 3,967 tons displacement. The crew comprised 450 officers and men.

Propulsion
Propulsion was provided by two sets of horizontal triple expansion engines with four cylindrical double-ended boilers.

Armament
Originally Kaiserin Elisabeth was armed with two  and six  guns, both types Model 1886. In 1905-06 she was reconstructed with two long-barreled 15 cm and six short-barreled 15 cm guns, both types Model 1901. Rounding out her armament were 16  quick-firing guns, one machine gun and four  torpedo tubes located above water, two on either beam.

Service
Although Kaiserin Elisabeth burned enormous quantities of coal, in 1914 she could still steam at a very fair speed and was stationed in China. Upon the outbreak of the First World War, Kaiserin Elisabeth took part in the defense of the German colony of Tsingtao, which was besieged by the Japanese on 25 August 1914; Japan had declared war on Germany on 23 August and the presence of Kaiserin Elisabeth led to Japan declaring war on Austria-Hungary on 25 August. (The German Asiatic Squadron, normally based at Tsingtau, had made a dash for home across the Pacific.) The ship′s crew was divided into two groups; one continued manning the ship, while the other bolstered the German garrison.

On 6 September 1914 the first air-sea battle in history took place when a Japanese Farman MF.11 aircraft launched by the seaplane carrier  unsuccessfully attacked Kaiserin Elisabeth with bombs.

Early in the siege Kaiserin Elisabeth and Jaguar made a sortie against the Japanese. Later, Kaiserin Elisabeth's 15 cm and 4.7 cm guns were removed and mounted ashore in "Batterie Elisabeth." As the siege progressed, the naval vessels trapped in the harbor were scuttled -- Cormoran, Iltis and Luchs on 28 September, S90 on 17 October and Tiger on 29 October. Finally, Kaiserin Elisabeth was scuttled on 2 November, followed by Jaguar on 7 November, the day the fortress surrendered to the Japanese.

References

Bibliography
 Barovič, Jože. Mornarica dvojne monarhije v I. svetovni vojni, Maribor 2005,  

 Gogg, Karl. Österreichische Kriegsmarine 1848-1918, Salzburg, 1967,

External links
 KUK Kriegsmarine
 Flickr SMS Kaiserin Elisabeth

 

Kaiser Franz Joseph I-class cruisers
Ships built in Pola
1890 ships
World War I cruisers of Austria-Hungary
Maritime incidents in November 1914
Scuttled vessels of Germany
World War I shipwrecks in the Pacific Ocean
Shipwrecks of China